Ezekiel Cheever School was a school located on Lombard St. in the Fair Haven neighborhood of New Haven, Connecticut, USA.  The school opened in 1896 and remained as late as 1967.  It was named for schoolteacher Ezekiel Cheever.

References

Educational institutions established in 1896
Defunct schools in Connecticut
Schools in New Haven, Connecticut
Fair Haven (New Haven)
1896 establishments in Connecticut